Funa fraterculus is a species of sea snail, a marine gastropod mollusk in the family Pseudomelatomidae, the turrids and allies

Description
The length of the shell attains 19 mm.

Distribution
This marine species occurs in the Mozambique Channel.

References

External links
 Specimen at MNHN, Paris
 
 

fraterculus
Gastropods described in 1988